RFX family member 8, lacking RFX DNA binding domain is a protein that in humans is encoded by the RFX8 gene.

References

Further reading